Grant Long (born 16 February 1961) is a South African former cricketer. He played in 36 first-class and 25 List A matches from 1979/80 to 1990/91.

References

External links
 

1961 births
Living people
South African cricketers
Border cricketers
Eastern Province cricketers
People from Makhanda, Eastern Cape
Cricketers from the Eastern Cape